The women's 20 kilometres walk event at the 2007 Pan American Games in Rio de Janeiro was held on July 22.

Results

References
Official results

Walk
2007
2007 in women's athletics